Xana is an Asturian mythical entity.

Xana X.A.N.A. or XANA may also refer to:

 Xana (annelid), a genus of annelids in the family Hormogastridae
 Xana Antunes (1964–2020), British business journalist
 Xana Qubadî (1700–1759), Kurdish poet
 Xana (musician), a Canadian pop musician
 Xana, a genus of wasps in the family Signiphoridae
 X.A.N.A., the main antagonist of Code Lyoko